Auguste Landrieu (born 13 April 1888, date of death unknown) was a Belgian gymnast. He competed in the men's team all-around event at the 1920 Summer Olympics, winning the silver medal.

References

External links
 

1888 births
Year of death missing
Belgian male artistic gymnasts
Olympic gymnasts of Belgium
Gymnasts at the 1920 Summer Olympics
Olympic silver medalists for Belgium
Medalists at the 1920 Summer Olympics
Olympic medalists in gymnastics
People from Ronse
Sportspeople from East Flanders
20th-century Belgian people